Dichomeris ligulacea is a moth in the family Gelechiidae. It was described by Hou-Hun Li, Hui Zhen and Wolfram Mey in 2013. It is found in Malawi.

The wingspan is about 19 mm. The forewings are greyish yellow, with scattered brown scales and a dark brown apex and termen, the latter with dark brown dots. There are dark brown spots at one-third and two-thirds of the cell, at the upper middle of the cell and at three-fifths of the fold. There is a short oblique stripe at end of the cell. The hindwings are grey.

Etymology
The species name refers to the tongue-shaped protrudence on the posterior margin of the saccal region and is derived from Latin ligulaceus (meaning tongue shaped).

References

Moths described in 2013
ligulacea